The Palace Rebellion was a 1949 coup attempt in Thailand. Its plotters aimed to overthrow the government of Field Marshal Plaek Phibunsongkhram and to restore his main civilian rival, Pridi Phanomyong, to the Thai political scene.

Pridi had disavowed the use of violence during the immediate aftermath of the 1947 coup, but the frustrations of exile eventually overcame him. Although in the People's Republic of China, he still maintained contacts with his supporters in Thailand and, with their help, he laid plans for a countercoup.

In the first week of February 1949, he secretly returned to Thailand. Phibun, however, soon learned of Pridi's intentions and quickly, a radio announcement was made in which he called Pridi his "friend." He went on to offer Pridi a position in the government, but Pridi decided to go ahead with his plans, and the field marshal's overtures were rebuffed. 

A state of emergency was declared by the government in anticipation of the countercoup. It began on February 26, when a Royal Thai Army officer loyal to Pridi and a group of supporters seized a radio station, and Free Thai elements and Thammasat University teachers and students occupied the Grand Palace. The group at the radio station announced on the air the formation of a new government headed by Pridi's friend, Direk Chaiyanam.

Major-General Sarit Thanarat then moved troops in and easily managed to oust Pridi from the palace grounds. In the meanwhile, the Royal Thai Navy and the Royal Thai Marine Corps took up defensive positions around Bangkok, to protect their allies.

The rebels managed to escape in naval vessels across the Chao Phraya River, and navy units engaged the army in fierce street fighting. A ceasefire was declared that afternoon, but it would take the navy and the army a full week to negotiate a resolution to the crisis.

References

Attempted coups in Thailand
Conflicts in 1949
20th century in Thailand
1949 in Thailand
Thailand